Rao Ram Singh was politician from Haryana.

Life and political career

Rao Ram Singh served in the Indian army. In 1977, he participated in the Rewari assembly constituency for the first time on the Janata Party ticket. In the very first political innings, he got the post of Minister of Education for Haryana. In 1978 he was made the speaker of Haryana Vidhan Sabha. In the 1982 assembly elections, he contested as an independent after not getting a Congress ticket and won the Rewari seat of Haryana Vidhan Sabha for the second time in a row. After winning, he rejoined the Congress and became the Transport Minister of Haryana. He won the Lok Sabha elections from Mahendragarh defeating ex-Chief Minister of Haryana Rao Birendra Singh. In 1991 and 1992, as a Minister of State in the Union Council of Ministers, he got the responsibility of Wasteland Development. He breathed his last on 30 January 2012.

Singh died in Medanta medictiy Hospital on January 31, 2012.

References

1925 births
2012 deaths